Surprise is a city in Maricopa County, in the U.S. state of Arizona. The population was 143,148 at the 2020 census, up from 117,517 in 2010 and just 30,848 in 2000.

The city has a  Aquatics Center and Maricopa County's northwest regional library, a $5.5 million,  library, along with a 100.3 cost of living index.

History
The city was founded in 1938 by Flora Mae Statler, who named it Surprise as she "would be surprised if the town ever amounted to much." Surprise officials previously thought the city was founded by Statler's husband, real estate developer and state legislator Homer C. Ludden, but in 2010 property records were discovered which listed Statler owning the land before she met Ludden.

When Surprise was subdivided to build inexpensive houses for agricultural workers, there were only a few houses and a gas station on the one-square-mile (1.6 km) parcel of land. Since then, the town has experienced tremendous growth. It incorporated as a city in 1960. The townsite is bounded by Greenway Road on the south, El Mirage Road on the east, Bell Road on the north, and Dysart Road on the west. City Hall is located on the site of one of Luke Air Force Base's former auxiliary airfields.

Tens of thousands of retirees moved to the city in the 1990s and early 2000s to live in Sun City Grand, an age-restricted resort-like community with homes built by the property development firm Del Webb.

Sun City Grand has become a large contributor to the city's population, which more than septupled from 10,187 to about 75,000 in 2004.

Geography
It is bordered to the northeast by Peoria, to the east by unincorporated Sun City West and Sun City, to the southeast by El Mirage, to the south by Glendale, and to the west by Buckeye and unincorporated Wittmann.

Demographics

As of the census of 2000, there were 30,848 people, 12,484 households, and 9,725 families residing in the city. The racial makeup of the city was 86.0% White, 2.6% Black or African American, 0.4% Native American, 1.1% Asian, 0.05% Pacific Islander, 7.9% from other races, and 2.0% from two or more races. 23.3% of the population were Hispanic or Latino of any race. In recent years, the racial makeup has varied due to the rapid expansion of the city.

There were 12,484 households, out of which 21.5% had children under the age of 18 living with them, 69.5% were married couples living together, 5.4% had a female householder with no husband present, and 22.1% were non-families. 17.9% of all households were made up of individuals, and 8.9% had someone living alone who was 65 years of age or older. The average household size was 2.46 and the average family size was 2.75 people.

In the city, the population was spread out, with 19.9% under the age of 18, 7.0% from 18 to 24, 22.4% from 25 to 44, 25.3% from 45 to 64, and 25.4% who were 65 years of age or older. The median age was 46 years. For every 100 females, there were 96.6 males. For every 100 females age 18 and over, there were 94.9 males.

The median income for a household in the city was $44,156, and the median income for a family was $47,899. Males had a median income of $33,079 versus $26,347 for females. The per capita income for the city was $21,451. About 5.6% of families and 8.7% of the population were below the poverty line, including 16.7% of those under age 18 and 3.3% of those age 65 or over.

In 2010, Surprise had a population of 117,517. The racial and ethnic composition of the population was 71.2% non-Hispanic white, 5.1% black or African American, 0.7% Native American, 2.6% Asian, 0.2% Pacific Islander, 0.1% non-Hispanic reporting some other race, 3.8% two or more races, and 18.5% Hispanic or Latino.

Economy

Largest employers
According to the city's 2016 Comprehensive Annual Financial Report, the top employers in the city are:

Sports
The city is the spring training home of the Kansas City Royals and the Texas Rangers baseball teams. These Major League Baseball teams use Surprise Stadium for their activities. The city also hosted a Golden Baseball League team in 2005, the Surprise Fightin' Falcons and the Recreation Campus ballpark and is the home city for a team in the Arizona Fall League, the Surprise Saguaros. It also hosted ESPN SportsCenter's 50 States in 50 Days segment on August 11, 2005.

As part of the city's Recreation Campus, Surprise is also home to the Surprise Tennis and Racquet Complex (STRC). Since its opening in August 2007, the complex has received numerous awards, including being named the 2008 Outstanding Facility of the year award by the USTA. The complex hosts various professional events throughout the year, including the Outback Champion Series tour, a USTA Pro Circuit event, and many USTA regional and sectional events. In 2009 the complex was chosen as the site for the Fed Cup Quarter Final between the U.S. and Argentina, and also that year it was chosen as the location for the first United States National Pickleball championships.

Government
Surprise is governed on the local level by a mayor and a six-member city council. The mayor is elected at large, while the council members are elected from the six districts which they represent. All city council elections are officially nonpartisan. All representatives serve four-year terms. The current mayor is Skip Hall.

The local government website earned a "Sunny Award" for the proactive disclosure of government data from Sunshine Review.

Education
The Dysart Unified School District serves the city of Surprise. Charter schools such as Arizona Charter Academy, Paradise Education Center, and Legacy Traditional School are also located in the area.

Rio Salado College, a part of the Maricopa County Community College District, has a satellite building in Surprise. 

Ottawa University–Arizona is a private, non-profit, Christian four-year university with a campus in Surprise's Civic Center Campus.  Opened in Fall 2017, the University has grown from 300 students to nearly 900 students in Fall 2019 and boasts over 20 varsity level athletic teams.  In 2019, OUAZ opened a 76,000 sf dormitory with 308 beds as well as a 26,000 sf student union with a fully equipped kitchen and dining facility, student lounge, team shop, conference areas and board room as well as the 35,000 sf, three-story O'Dell Center for Athletics.

Infrastructure

Roads

Surprise is served by Loop 303 and U.S. Route 60. U.S. Route 60 leads southeast to Phoenix and northwest to Wickenburg and Las Vegas (via U.S. Route 93). Surprise is also served by many major arterial roads.

Utilities
Surprise is served by the following utilities:
 Cable: Cox Communications
 Electricity: Arizona Public Service
 Gas: Southwest Gas
 Telephone: CenturyLink QC
 Water: Circle City Water Company, Beardsley Water Company, Chaparral Water Company, EPCOR Water, the City of El Mirage, Morristown Water Company, Puesta Del Sol Water Company, Saguaro Acres, Saguaro View, and West End Water Company

Police
The Surprise Police Department consists of a field operations division, administrative services division, criminal investigations division, and technical services division.

Mission Home Cemetery
The Mission Home Cemetery, also known as the Sleeping Bride Cemetery, is a historic cemetery located in Surprise.

References

External links

 

 
Cities in Arizona
Cities in Maricopa County, Arizona
Populated places established in 1938
Populated places in the Sonoran Desert
Phoenix metropolitan area